In Tokyo is a bossa nova album by João Gilberto, recorded live in Tokyo (Japan) in September 2003 and released in 2004.

Track listing
 "Acontece que Eu Sou Baiano" (Caymmi) – 2:56
 "Meditação" (Gimbel, Jobim, Mendonça) – 5:33
 "Doralice" (Almeida, Caymmi) – 3:16
 "Corcovado" (Jobim, Lees) – 4:32
 "Este Seu Olhar" (Jobim) – 4:34
 "Isto Aqui o que É ?" (Barroso) – 4:29
 "Wave" (Jobim) – 4:36
 "Pra que Discutir com Madame ?" (Barbosa, Almeida) – 6:01
 "Ligia" (Jobim) – 5:37
 "Louco" (Almeida, Batista) – 4:38
 "Bolinha de Papel" (Pereira) – 4:08
 "Rosa Morena" (Caymmi) – 5:35
 "Adeus América" (Barbosa, Geraldo) – 5:12
 "Preconceito" (Batista, Pinto) – 3:55
 "Aos Pés da Cruz" (Da Zilda, Pinto) – 3:56

Personnel
 João Gilberto - Acoustic guitar and vocals

References

Bossa nova albums
João Gilberto live albums
2004 live albums